Paul Herzberg (born 1953) is an actor and writer, known for The Honourable Woman (2014), Black Earth Rising (2019), My Week with Marilyn (2011), Room 36 (2005), Blood and Cry Freedom (1987).

Early life

Born in Cape Town, Herzberg studied acting at the University of Cape Town drama school and scriptwriting at the College for Advanced Technical Education in Pretoria. He moved to the UK in 1976, after having served as a conscripted soldier on the Namibian border, during the period of the Angolan war. He then studied at the London Academy of Music and Dramatic Art.

Career

As an actor, his film and television appearances include Smiley's People,  Agatha Christie's Poirot - Dumb Witness and The Life and Loves of a She-Devil.  He co-wrote and starred in the feature film, Almost Heaven which won the Nashville International Best Feature Award.

On stage, he played Stanley Kowalski in A Streetcar Named Desire at the Mermaid Theatre. He is a regular at Manchester's Royal Exchange where his roles have included Bluntschli in Arms And The Man, Shorty in People Are Living There, Colbert in While The Sun Shines, Captain Papa Louw in his award-winning play The Dead Wait and recently as Capulet in Romeo and Juliet. He has appeared twice at the Chichester Festival theatre, first as Gratiano in The Merchant of Venice (with Sir Alec Guinness as Shylock); and then in Carrington, as Mark Gertler. He was in the world premiere of Dancing At Lughnasa in the role of Gerry Evans at the Abbey Theatre in Dublin (1990). In 2003, he played John Vorster in Sir Antony Sher's play I.D. at the Almeida theatre. He was cast as Shylock in The Merchant Of Venice at the Arcola in 2007. He joined the RSC at Stratford for The Taming Of The Shrew in which he played Vincentio (2012). The following year he play Loonie Schutzmacher in Shaw's The Doctor's Dilemma at the National Theatre. He returned to the National in the roles of Yair Hirshfeld and Shimon Peres in Oslo which transferred to the Harold Pinter Theatre.

Herzberg first began writing for BBC Radio in 1992 with the 60 minute play The Song Of My Father; followed by several plays and short stories. His short radio play Where's The Bull?, won the London Radio playwright's festival in 1992 and was broadcast on LBC Radio.

His stage play The Dead Wait is based on the story of a young South African athlete who is a conscripted soldier in the Angolan Civil War and was shortlisted for the Verity Bargate Award in 1997. The story also reflects Herzberg's own experiences as a conscripted soldier before leaving South Africa. The Dead Wait was broadcast on BBC Radio and received its theatrical world premiere' at the Barney Simon Theatre at the Market, in 1997. In 2002 it received its British premiere' at the Royal Exchange in Manchester, with Herzberg in the role of Captain Papa Louw, where it was nominated for three Manchester Evenings News Awards (best new play, production and actor) winning in the last category. The play was published by Oberon books. in 2013, it was produced by The Park Theatre.

Personal life

Herzberg has been married to Oona Kirsch since 1988. They have two children. His godson is Pretty Little Liars actor Julian Morris.

Selected film and television roles
Black Earth Rising, (2019) - as Zava Zand
The Honourable Woman, (2014) - as Daniel Borgoraz
Papadopolous & Sons, (2012) - as Nikolas
Almost Heaven, (2005) - as BlagdenThe Dirty Dozen: Next Mission, (1985) - as Private ReynoldsMurder City, Just Seventeen (2006) - as Max EdwardsHeartbeat, Music of the Spheres (2003) - as Marek StarostaThe Inspector Lynley Mysteries, Well Schooled in Murder (2002) - as Barry SummersThe Famous Five, Five Have a Mystery to Solve (1996) - EmilioAgatha Christie's Poirot - Dumb Witness (1996) - as Jacob TaniosSoldier Soldier, Staying Together (1993) - as KurtLovejoy, Benin Bronze (1992) - as AndreCry Freedom (1987) - as BeukesSmiley's People (1982) (mini) - as Villem CravenThe Professionals, Mixed Doubles (1980) - as SerpoyTales of the Unexpected - neck (1979) - as John BannisterTales of the Unexpected - "A Time to Die" episode (9/9 - 1988) - as Henri
Wild Discovery Narrator

Selected theatre roles

Arms And The Man (1989) - as Bluntschli, Royal Exchange Theatre
A Streetcar Named Desire (1984) - as Stanley Kowalski, Mermaid Theatre
The Merchant Of Venice (1984) - as Gratiano, Chichester Festival Theatre
Carrington (1993) - as Mark Gertler, Chichester Festival Theatre
Dancing At Lughnasa (1990) - as Gerry Evans, Abbey Theatre, Dublin
I.D. (2003) - as John Vorster, Almeida
The Merchant Of Venice (2007) - as Shylock, Arcola
Taming Of The Shrew (2012) - as Vincentio, Royal Shakespeare Company.
The Doctor's Dilemma (2012) - as Schutzmacher, National Theatre.
Oslo (2017) - as Yair Hirshfeld and Shimon Peres, National Theatre.

Selected writing

Sweet LIke Suga - (1981/2) Old Red Lion, Centaur Montreal, Theatre 2000 Ottawa, stage play
The Song Of My father - (1992) BBC Radio 4 60 minute play
The Crackwalker - (1993) BBC Radio 4 short story
Where's The Bull? - (1993) LBC Winner London Radio Playwrights Festival
Dreaming Up Laura - (1995) BBC Radio 4 90 minute play
The Dead Wait - (2002) Royal Exchange Theatre, stage play
Almost Heaven - (2005) Feature Film (co-wrote)

References

External links

Paul Herzberg at the Contemporary Africa Database
The Dead Wait at the Royal Exchange Theatre

1953 births
Living people
South African dramatists and playwrights
University of Cape Town alumni
University of Pretoria alumni